Anna-Karin Hesse (1 August 1961 – 14 July 1983) was a Swedish alpine skier who competed in the 1980 Winter Olympics.

External links
 sports-reference.com

1961 births
1983 deaths
Swedish female alpine skiers
Olympic alpine skiers of Sweden
Alpine skiers at the 1980 Winter Olympics
People from Härnösand
Sportspeople from Västernorrland County
20th-century Swedish women